Charles August Girard (December 16, 1884 – August 6, 1936) was a pitcher in Major League Baseball. He played for the Philadelphia Phillies in 1910.

References

External links

1884 births
1936 deaths
Major League Baseball pitchers
Philadelphia Phillies players
Sportspeople from Brooklyn
Baseball players from New York City
Haverhill Hustlers players
Lynn Shoemakers players
York White Roses players
Trenton Tigers players
Allentown (minor league baseball) players
Burials at Cypress Hills Cemetery